The 2017 Dynamic Treviso Open, was the fifth and final Euro Tour 9-Ball pool event in 2017. The event was won by Poland's Wiktor Zieliński who defeated Austria's Mario He 9–1 in the final. This was Zielinski's first Euro Tour victory, as he became the youngest player to win a Euro Tour event, aged 16.

2016 Treviso Open champion David Alcaide lost in the last 32 of the event against Maximilian Lechner.

Tournament format
The event saw a total of 142 players compete, in a double-elimination knockout tournament, until the last 32 stage; where the tournament was contested as single elimination.

Prize fund

Tournament results

References

External links

Euro Tour
Sporting events in Italy
2017 Euro Tour events
Sports competitions in Treviso